Congreve may refer to:

 Congreve (surname)
 Congreve (crater), a lunar crater
 Congreve (horse), an Argentine thoroughbred racehorse who sired Kayak II
 Congreve, Penkridge, a manor house and its former land in Penkridge, Staffordshire, England
 Congreve rocket, military weapon developed in 1804
 Mount Congreve, the stately home of the Congreve family in County Waterford, Ireland